The Battle of Amba Alagi was fought in May 1941, during World War II, part of the East African Campaign.
After the Italian defeat at Keren in April 1941, Prince Amedeo, Duke of Aosta withdrew his forces to the mountain stronghold at Amba Alagi. The mountain had galleries carved into the rock to protect the defending troops and hold ample ammunition and stores and the Italian troops thought themselves to be impregnable. According to other sources, however, the fortress was easily defendable thanks to its position and the mountainous terrain, but lacked food and water, so that Marshal Enrico Caviglia later criticised the Duke for having chosen it for his last stand, calling the Amba Alagi "uno scoglio senz'acqua e senza viveri" ("a rock with neither water nor food"). The initial attacks on the approaches to Amba Alagi by British troops under Major-General Mayne from the north, commenced on 4 May with a pincer from the eastern and western sides.

A final assault was planned for the next day but a lucky strike by an artillery shell hit an Italian fuel dump, sending a stream of oil into the last remaining Italian drinking water, forcing the garrison to end its resistance.

The Italian commander began ceasefire negotiations on 16 May 1941. The Duke of Aosta and his garrison surrendered to the British commander, Lieutenant-General Sir Alan Cunningham, on 19 May 1941. The Duke and the garrison were accorded the honours of war. This capitulation marked the end of any significant Italian control on East Africa, although some garrisons would continue to fight until 1943.

The film La pattuglia dell'Amba Alagi, shot in 1953 by Flavio Calzavara, glorifies the Italian defence against the British.

Gallery

See also 

 List of British military equipment of World War II
 List of Second Italo-Ethiopian War weapons of Ethiopia-Arbegnoch used Ethiopian and captured Italian weapons. 
 List of Italian Army equipment in World War II

References

Sources
 
 Diamond, John. Archibald Wavell. Osprey Pub, 2012.
 Jaques, Tony. Dictionary of Battles and Sieges. Westport, Conn. Greenwood, 2007
 Shinn, David Hamilton., Thomas P. Ofcansky, and Chris Prouty. Historical Dictionary of Ethiopia. Lanham, MD: Scarecrow, 2004.

Battles and operations of World War II
Battle of Amba Alagi
Battle of Amba Alagi
Battle of Amba Alagi
Conflicts in 1941
Battle of Amba Alagi
Battle of Amba Alagi
Battles of World War II involving Italy
Battles involving Ethiopia
Battles of World War II involving the United Kingdom
Battles and operations of World War II involving South Africa
May 1941 events